The R604 road is a regional road in County Cork, Ireland. It travels in a loop from the R600 road near Ballinspittle south to the Old Head of Kinsale and then north again to rejoin the R600.

References

Regional roads in the Republic of Ireland
Roads in County Cork